WYHB-CD, virtual channel 39 (UHF digital channel 25), is a low-powered television station licensed to serve Chattanooga, Tennessee, United States. The station is owned by Innovate Corp.

History 
The station’s construction permit was issued on March 16, 2007 under the callsign of WYHB-LD. It moved to WYHB-CD on April 23, 2012, then to WHUA-CD on December 13, 2018, and the current callsign of WYHB-CD on December 14, 2018.

Digital channels
The station's digital signal is multiplexed:

References 

Low-power television stations in the United States
Innovate Corp.
Television stations in Tennessee
Television channels and stations established in 2007
2007 establishments in Tennessee